Nivard (Nivo) was the Bishop of Reims before 657 and until 673.  He was brother-in-law of Childeric II.  He restored Hautvilliers Abbey and was later buried there.

Recognized as a saint by the Catholic Church, his feast day is September 1.

External links
Catholic Online: Nivard

7th-century Frankish bishops
Bishops of Reims
7th-century Frankish saints